Gerhard Kress (14 February 1894 Tallinn – 24 June 1939 Tallinn) was an Estonian politician. He was a member of II Riigikogu. He was a member of the Riigikogu since 29 September 1923. He replaced Max Bock. On 9 April 1924, he resigned his position and he was replaced by Axel de Vries.

References

1894 births
1939 deaths
Politicians from Tallinn
People from Kreis Harrien
Baltic-German people
German-Baltic Party politicians
Members of the Riigikogu, 1923–1926
Estonian military personnel of the Estonian War of Independence
Estonian emigrants to Germany